Coenraad Nicolaas (Coen) Teulings (born 13 December 1958) is a Dutch economist and distinguished professor at Utrecht University. He was formerly professor of Economics at the University of Amsterdam and the University of Cambridge and former Director of the Bureau for Economic Policy Analysis, as well as Chairman of Merifin Capital.

Biography 
Born in Rijswijk, Coen Teulings was the grandson of Frans Teulings, Deputy Prime Minister of the Netherlands 1951-52. He was a student at the University of Amsterdam, where he received his MA of Economics cum laude in 1985, and his PhD in 1990 with a thesis entitled "Conjunctuur en kwalificatie" (Cycle and skill).

In 1985 Teulings started as researcher for SEO Economic Research. From 1991 to 1995 he held a Research fellowship of the Royal Netherlands Academy of Arts and Sciences. From 1995 to 1998 he headed the department of income policy of the Dutch Ministry of Social Affairs. In 1997-98 he was appointed Professor of Labour Economics at the University of Amsterdam, and from 1998 to 2004 in the same function Professor of Labour Economics at the Erasmus University Rotterdam. From 1998 to 2004 he also directed the Tinbergen Institute as successor of Herman K. van Dijk. In 2004 back in Amsterdam he was appointed Professor of Economics at the University of Amsterdam, and Director of SEO Economic Research from 2004 to 2006. From 2006 to May 2013 he was Director of the Netherlands Bureau for Economic Policy Analysis. From 1 October 2013 he was appointed as the Montague Burton Professor of Industrial Relations and Labour Economics at Cambridge University. From 2018 onward, he is distinguished professor at Utrecht University.

Teulings has been elected Fellow of the Tinbergen Institute, Fellow of the Institute for the Study of Labor, Fellow of CESifo in Munich, and Fellow of the Centre for Economic Policy Research in London.

Publications 
Teulings published numerous articles in the field of economics Books:
 1998. Corporatism or competition?: labour contracts, institutions and wage structures in international comparison. With Joop Hartog. Cambridge University Press.

Articles, a selection:
 Teulings, Coen N. "The wage distribution in a model of the assignment of skills to jobs." Journal of Political Economy (1995): 280-315.
 Dolado, J., Kramarz, F., Machin, S., Manning, A., Margolis, D., Teulings, C., ... & Keen, M. (1996). The economic impact of minimum wages in Europe. Economic policy, 319-372.
 Teulings, Coen N., and Pieter A. Gautier. "The right man for the job." The Review of Economic Studies 71.2 (2004): 553-580.
 Teulings, Coen N., and Casper G. De Vries. "Generational accounting, solidarity and pension losses." De Economist 154.1 (2006): 63-83.

References

External links 
 Prof. dr. C.N. Teulings (Coen) Amsterdam School of Economics

1958 births
Living people
Dutch civil servants
Dutch economists
Directors of the Bureau for Economic Policy Analysis
University of Amsterdam alumni
Academic staff of Erasmus University Rotterdam
Academic staff of the University of Amsterdam
People from Rijswijk
Professors of the University of Cambridge